Lee Chang-wook (born July 2, 1984) is a South Korean actor.

Filmography

Movies 

 White Night (2012)
 My Way (2011)
 The Gifted Hands (2013)
 Rough Play (2013)

References

External links
Lee Chang-wook at Daum

1984 births
Living people
South Korean male film actors
21st-century South Korean male actors
Sejong University alumni